Shrewsbury College is a further education college located in the Sutton Farm suburb of Shrewsbury, Shropshire, England.

Previously called Shrewsbury College of Arts and Technology and, earlier, Shrewsbury Technical College, the college is based on a campus on London Road. The College provides vocational excellence across a range of disciplines and has working environments for students including a commercial restaurant, Origins, a commercial salon, Evolve a student zone including a new Student Learning Centre and The Hub.

The College is the main provider of vocational education in the county and has a full range of full-time and part-time courses available in the full range of subject areas. In 2012, Shrewsbury College was named by The National Data Service as the highest placed general FE college in Shropshire, Telford and Wrekin and Staffordshire based on their success rates for young students. In 2019, it was rated Inadequate by Ofsted.

Academic offerings

Students can now combine different vocational subjects at Level 2 (e.g. Sport and Business) and can complement their courses at Level 3 with A Levels. Shrewsbury College also offers Higher Education (HE) options and Professional Development courses for adults. The College has recently undergone an estates investment programme with over £15m being spent to create a new campus at London Road.

University partnership
The College has a partnership with Staffordshire University for areas of the curriculum including computing science, counselling theory and practice, electrical and electronic technology, manufacturing technology, mechanical technology and sports coaching and physical education.

The college is a founder member of the Staffordshire University Regional Federation (SURF Consortium). It also holds an annual Higher Awards Ceremony in St Chad's Church, Shrewsbury.

History
The college traces its origins to the Radbrook campus, which was in use up until 2014, when it was sold to a developer to be turned into luxury housing. The Radbrook site was home to Shropshire Technical School for Girls, founded around 1895 and later known as "Shropshire College of Domestic Science and Dairy Work" and then "Radbrook College of Agriculture". It amalgamated with other institutions and became a campus of Shrewsbury College of Arts and Technology.

Merger
In 2016, the college merged with Shrewsbury Sixth Form College to form the Shrewsbury Colleges Group. Together, the college offers academic and vocational courses from three campuses across Shrewsbury.

In the merged college's first Ofsted report, the college scored Inadequate in both "Behaviour and attitudes" and "Leadership and management" with the remaining scored at Good. The college attempted to, unsuccessfully, overturn the report before it was published - with Ofsted upholding the grading upon their revisit.

References

External links
Shrewsbury Colleges Group website.

Further education colleges in Shropshire
Schools in Shrewsbury